Ilya Aleksandrovich Shvedyuk (born 7 September 1996) is a Russian football player. He plays for FC Chelyabinsk.

Club career
He made his debut in the Russian Football National League for FC Tekstilshchik Ivanovo on 10 July 2021 in a game against FC Rotor Volgograd.

References

External links
 
 Profile by Russian Football National League

1996 births
People from Blagoveshchensk
Sportspeople from Amur Oblast
Living people
Russian footballers
Association football midfielders
FC Smena Komsomolsk-na-Amure players
FC Avangard Kursk players
FC Nosta Novotroitsk players
FC Tekstilshchik Ivanovo players
Russian Second League players
Russian First League players